Anna Synodinou (Greek: Άννα Συνοδινού; 21 November 1927 – 7 January 2016) was a Greek actress and politician.

Born in Loutraki, she studied at the National Theatre of Greece Drama School. She mainly excelled in ancient drama and won the Kotopouli theatre award twice. She also performed in Shakespearean stage productions. She had a brief but notable career in cinema, and a sparse presence in Greek television where she was awarded for her role in the series Matomena Homata.

She was elected to the Hellenic Parliament for New Democracy MP in 1974 and remained an MP until 1990. She served as deputy minister for social security from 1977 to 1981.

Filmography

References

External links
 
 Cine.gr page on Anna Synodinou

1927 births
2016 deaths
20th-century Greek actresses
New Democracy (Greece) politicians
Greek actor-politicians
Greek MPs 1974–1977
Greek MPs 1977–1981
Greek MPs 1981–1985
Greek MPs 1985–1989
Greek MPs 1989 (June–November)
Greek MPs 1989–1990
20th-century Greek women politicians
Greek people of Italian descent
People from Corinthia